Cheteoscelis is a genus of moths in the family Geometridae.

Species
 Cheteoscelis bistriaria (Packard, 1876)
 Cheteoscelis faseolaria (Guenée, 1857)
 Cheteoscelis graefiaria (Hulst, 1886)
 Cheteoscelis naenia Druce
 Cheteoscelis orthogramma Dyar
 Cheteoscelis pectinaria (Grossbeck, 1910)

References
 Cheteoscelis at Markku Savela's Lepidoptera and Some Other Life Forms
 Natural History Museum Lepidoptera genus database

Geometrinae